The 1922 United States Senate election in Maine was held on September 11, 1922, to elect a United States senator from Maine. Incumbent Senator Frederick Hale was re-elected to a second term. 

Incumbent Republican Senator Frederick Hale was re-elected to a second term in office, defeating Democratic former Governor Oakley Curtis.

Republican primary

Candidates
Howard Davies
Frank E. Guernsey, U.S. Representative from Dover-Foxcroft
Frederick Hale, incumbent Senator since 1917

Results

Democratic primary

Candidates
 Oakley C. Curtis, former Governor of Maine (1915–17)

Results
Curtis was unopposed in the Democratic primary.

General election

Results

See also 
 1922 United States Senate elections

References 

1922
Maine
United States Senate